Route 598, or Highway 598, may refer to:

Canada
 Alberta Highway 598
  Ontario Highway 598

Ireland
  R598 regional road

United Kingdom
  A598 road

United States